Sherlock Holmes is the most portrayed literary human character in film and television history, having appeared on screen 254 times as of 2012. Additionally, many actors have portrayed Sherlock Holmes in audio dramas and stage productions.

Radio and audio dramas

Stage plays

Television and DTV films

Television series

Theatrical films

Video games

See also
Adaptations of Sherlock Holmes
List of actors who have played Dr. Watson
List of actors who have played Inspector Lestrade
List of actors who have played Mycroft Holmes
List of actors who have played Mrs. Hudson
List of actors who have played Professor Moriarty

References

Actors who have played Sherlock Holmes
Holmes, Sherlock